Patrick Gerald Duggan (born 24 March 1945), known professionally as Patrick Malahide, is a veteran British film, television and theatre actor, author and producer, known, amongst other things, for his roles as Inspector Alleyn in The Inspector Alleyn Mysteries, Detective Sergeant Albert “Charlie” Chisholm in the TV series Minder, Balon Greyjoy in the TV series Game of Thrones as well as the big screen in a number of international films.

Life and career
Malahide was born in Reading, Berkshire, the son of Irish immigrants; his mother was a cook, and his father a school secretary. He was educated at Douai School, Woolhampton, Berkshire.

He made his television debut in 1976, in an episode of The Flight of the Heron, then in single episodes of Sutherland's Law and The New Avengers (1976) and ITV Playhouse (1977). He was then in an adaptation of The Eagle of the Ninth, and his first film was Sweeney 2 in the following year. In 1979 he began a nine-year stint as Detective Sergeant Albert "Cheerful Charlie" Chisholm in the popular TV series Minder.

His television appearances have included dramas The Singing Detective (1986) and Middlemarch (1994), and he played Ngaio Marsh's Inspector Roderick Alleyn in a 1993–94 series. His films include Comfort and Joy (1984), A Month in the Country (1987) and Captain Corelli's Mandolin (2001). In 1999, he made a small appearance in the introduction to the James Bond film The World Is Not Enough as a Swiss banker named Lachaise working in Bilbao. He played Mr. Ryder in the 2008 film adaptation of Brideshead Revisited, and from 2012 to 2016 portrayed Balon Greyjoy, the father of Theon Greyjoy, in the TV series Game of Thrones. He portrayed Magnus Crome in the 2018 film Mortal Engines.

Filmography

References

External links

1945 births
Living people
English male film actors
English male stage actors
English male television actors
People educated at Douai School
People from Reading, Berkshire
English people of Irish descent
Male actors from Berkshire
20th-century English male actors
21st-century English male actors